Agriakona is a village in the municipal unit of Valtetsi, Arcadia, Greece. In the year of 2011 Agriakona had a population of 39. Agriakona is situated in a remote area at the southeastern foot of the Tsemperou mountain, at 660 m elevation. It is 3 km northeast of Skortsinos, 5 km south of Dafni, 7 km northwest of Kollines, 16 km southeast of Megalopoli and 23 km southwest of Tripoli. Agriakona suffered damage from the 2007 Greek forest fires.

Population

See also
List of settlements in Arcadia

External links
History and information about Agriakona
 Agriakona on the GTP Travel Pages

References

Valtetsi
Populated places in Arcadia, Peloponnese